Repeat Dive (Tzlila Chozeret) is a 1982 Israeli drama film directed by Shimon Dotan. It was entered into the 32nd Berlin International Film Festival.

Cast
 Mosko Alkalai
 Zaharira Harifai
 Dan Muggia
 Doron Nesher as Yoav
 Liron Nirgad
 Batia Rosenthal as Rachel
 Yair Rubin
 Dalia Shimko
 Ze'ev Shimshoni
 Ami Traub

References

External links

1982 films
1980s Hebrew-language films
1982 drama films
Films directed by Shimon Dotan
Israeli drama films